The 1996 French Open was a tennis tournament that took place on the outdoor clay courts at the Stade Roland Garros in Paris, France. The tournament was held from 27 May until 9 June. It was the 95th staging of the French Open, and the second Grand Slam tennis event of 1996.

Seeds
Champion seeds are indicated in bold text while text in italics indicates the round in which those seeds were eliminated.

Draw

Finals

Top half

Section 1

Section 2

Bottom half

Section 3

Section 4

References

External links
 Association of Tennis Professionals (ATP) – main draw
1996 French Open – Men's draws and results at the International Tennis Federation

Men's Doubles
French Open by year – Men's doubles